Mark Dodd (born September 14, 1965) is an American former professional soccer player who played as a goalkeeper. Dodd spent one season in the Major Indoor Soccer League, six in the American Professional Soccer League, and four in Major League Soccer with the Dallas Burn. He also earned fifteen caps with the US Men’s National Team.

High school and college
Dodd attended Richardson High School, graduating in 1984. He then attended TCU in 1985 then Duke University in 1986 for one year, then transferred to Duke University in 1985, where he played college soccer. He became first-team goalkeeper in 1986 and backstopped them to the NCAA Championship. It was Duke's first national championship in any sport.

Playing career

MISL and APSL
Following the completion of his collegiate career, Dodd signed with the Dallas Sidekicks of the MISL. In 1990, Dodd signed with the Colorado Foxes of the American Professional Soccer League. This was the first year of the APSL, which was formed by the merger of the Western Soccer League and the American Soccer League. Dodd was named APSL West Player of the Year and a first team All-Star. In 1992 and 1993, the Foxes won back-to-back APSL championships with Dodd in goal.</ref>

Major League Soccer
The Dallas Burn of Major League Soccer selected Dodd in the 6th round (53rd overall) of the 1996 MLS Inaugural Player Draft. Dodd was the team's starting keeper. He played in 31 games in the Burn's inaugural season and was named MLS's first Goalkeeper of the Year. Dodd helped lead the Burn to the 1997 US Open Cup Championship where he was chosen as the game’s MVP. He played four seasons for Dallas, setting numerous team and league records. Dodd also made consecutive trips to the MLS All-Star game, as well as being named to the MLS Best XI. 

Six games into the 1999 season, Dodd tore ligaments in his hand. He had surgery on his right hand in February 2000 and retired soon after.

International
Dodd collected fifteen caps with the U.S. national team, his first coming in 1988 against Guatemala and his last against China in 1997.  Throughout his US National Team goalkeeping career, he earned seven shutouts and also held a US National Team record for most consecutive shutout minutes. Dodd was named an alternate on the 1998 World Cup team.

Honors

Duke University 

 NCAA National Champions: 1986

Colorado Foxes 

 APSL Champions: 1992, 1993

Dallas Burn 

 US Open Cup: 1997

Individual 

MLS Goalkeeper of the Year: 1996
MLS Best XI: 1996
MLS All-Star: 1996, 1997

References 

1965 births
Living people
American soccer players
Association football goalkeepers
FC Dallas players
Duke University alumni
Duke Blue Devils men's soccer players
Soccer players from Dallas
United States men's international soccer players
1992 King Fahd Cup players
Dallas Sidekicks (original MISL) players
American Professional Soccer League players
Colorado Foxes players
Major League Soccer players
Major League Soccer All-Stars